Osterley is a district in London.

Osterley may also refer to:

Places 
 Osterley, New South Wales, a settlement in Australia
 Osterley tube station, an underground station in west London

Ships 
 Osterley (East Indiaman)
 SS Osterley

See also 
 Osterley Park, in London
 Osterley Television Centre (also known as the Sky Campus), in London
 Oesterley, a surname